Ayanna Oliva is a Filipina model, singer, dancer, host, DJ, and VJ. She was a member of the Kitty Girls.

Biography

Career
Ayanna started her showbiz career as a VJ in Studio 23. She, along with 3 other VJ's, won the 2004 Studio 23 VJ Hunt.

A year later, Ayanna sang Bulong Ng Damdamin, an inventive duo number, with artist Boy2 Quizon in the latter's debut album Biyaheng Reggae released under GMA Records.  She, Angel Locsin and four other girls were part of Axe Choose the Girl, Spend Her Money Promo.  Where they fulfill five lucky men's dreams by giving them an unforgettable date and almost half a million shopping spree.

In 2006, Ayanna, and 4 other girls formed the Kitty Girls. The following year they were signed under Star Records.

Filmography

Discography
Kitty Girls
2005: Biyaheng Reggae – Bulong Ng Damdamin with Boy 2 Quizon

References

External links 
 https://www.facebook.com/ayanna.oliva

Living people
1986 births
Star Magic
21st-century Filipino women singers